The Bennett Valley AVA  is an American Viticultural Area located in Sonoma County, California.  The boundaries of this appellation lie completely within the North Coast AVA, almost completely within the Sonoma Valley AVA and overlaps into some areas of the Sonoma Coast AVA and Sonoma Mountain AVA. The region was granted AVA status on December 23, 2003 following the petition of Matanzas Creek Winery. The AVA is surrounded to the south, east and west by the Sonoma Mountains and to the north by the city of Santa Rosa, California. The region receives a moderating effect on its climate from Pacific Ocean through the cool coastal fogs and breeze that creep into the area from the southwest through Crane Canyon between Sonoma Mountain and Taylor Mountain.  Barbera, Cabernet Sauvignon, Cabernet Franc, Chardonnay, Grenache, Merlot, Pinot noir, Sauvignon blanc and Syrah are the leading grape varieties planted.

See also
Bennett Valley

References

External links
 Bennett Valley AVA Bennett Valley Grape Growers

American Viticultural Areas
American Viticultural Areas of the San Francisco Bay Area
Geography of Sonoma County, California
2003 establishments in California